Australian Druglords (also known as Under Surveillance: Australian Druglords) is an Australian documentary television series on the Nine Network hosted by actor Gary Sweet. Australian Druglords gives an insight into some of Australia's biggest druglords from inside the New South Wales Police drug squad, with unprecedented access to confidential police files.

Episodes
Season 1
Episode 1 – Richard Buttrose
Episode 2 – Drew & Nathan Baggaley
Episode 3 – Wayne Patterson
Episode 4 – Shane Oien
Episode 5 – Shayne Hatfield
Episode 6 – Yonky Tan
Episode 7 – Samir Rafahi
Episode 8 – John Griffiths
Episode 9 – Duc & Van Dang
Episode 10 - Charlotte Lindstrom

References

See also
 Australian Families of Crime

2010s Australian documentary television series
Nine Network original programming
2010 Australian television series debuts
2010 Australian television series endings